Mudanya (Mudania, ta Moudaniá [Pl.]) (the site of ancient Apamea Myrlea) is a town and district of Bursa Province in the Marmara region of Turkey. It is located on the Gulf of Gemlik, part of the southern coast of the Sea of Marmara. As of 1911, it was connected with Bursa by the Mudanya–Bursa railway and a carriage road, and with Istanbul by steamers. Mudanya has only an open anchorage usable in calm weather. The town produces olive oil and there is a pier used by local fishing and cargo boats.

History
According to the Ottoman General Census of 1881/82-1893, the kaza of Mudanya of Hüdavendigâr vilayet had a total population of 16.683, consisting of 11.792 Greeks and 4.891 Muslims. A port city, it also had a railway connection to Bursa which was completed in 1875. The railway had a pier at the seaport of Mudanya for exporting. Istanbul was often the recipient of exported goods from Mudanya. Silk was a popular export. During the Turkish War of Independence, Mudanya was bombarded and thus partially burned by the British Fleet during the Summer Offensive of 1920. Sergeant Şükrü from Mudanya and 9 of his brothers-in-arms were killed during the allied bombardment and subsequent landing.

Liberation of Mudanya 
Mudanya and its environs were liberated by the Turkish Kocaeli Army Corps under the Command of Halit (Karsıalan) Paşa on the 12th of September 1922. Cavalry Captain Abidin's 3 consecutive reports regarding the capture of the Greek 11th Infantry Division (Manisa Division), 45th &17th Infantry regiments along with its commanders and with Major-General Nikolaos Kladas in Mudanya on the 12th of September 1922 highlights the events.

The town was the signing place of the Armistice of Mudanya between Turkey, Italy, France and Britain on October 11, 1922, following the Turkish War of Independence.

After the Treaty of Lausanne and the Greco-Turkish population exchange agreement, the Greeks of the town were transferred into mainland Greece, establishing a settlement to which they gave the name of their previous town, Nea Moudania (New Moudania, located on the Chalkidiki peninsula, in the Macedonia region of Greece). In return, a number of Cretan Turks were settled in Mudanya.

Traditional architecture in Mudanya

See also
 Nea Moudania

References

External links

 District governor's official website
 District municipality's official website

 
Cities in Turkey
Populated places in Bursa Province
Populated coastal places in Turkey
Districts of Bursa Province